Patersonia sericea, commonly known as purple flag  or silky purple-flag is a species of plant in the iris family Iridaceae and is endemic to eastern Australia. It is a densely-tufted perennial herb with linear, sword-shaped leaves, broadly egg-shaped, bluish-violet tepals and an oval capsule.

Description
Flowering mainly occurs from June to November, each flower open for one day, but each stem producing many flowers.

Taxonomy and naming
Patersonia sericea was first described in 1807 by Robert Brown in Curtis's Botanical Magazine, from specimens "...furnished us by Messrs. Lee and Kennedy, of Hammersmith, West London who received the seeds, from which they raised it, from Port Jackson". The specific epithet (sericea) is derived from the Latin word sericus meaning "silken", referring to the hairs at the base of the juvenile leaves.

The names of two varieties of P. sericea are accepted by the Australian Plant Census:
 Patersonia sericea var. longifolia (R.Br.)

Patersonia longifolia was described in 1810 by Robert Brown in his Prodromus Florae Novae Hollandiae et Insulae Van Diemen but reduced to a variety in 1893 by Charles Moore in the Handbook of the Flora of New South Wales.

Distribution and habitat
Purple flag (var. longifolia) grows in open forest and heath on the coast and ranges on soils derived from sandstone, from the Hunter River in New South Wales to the Genoa River in far north-eastern Victoria.

Silky purple-flag (var. sericea) is found in forest, woodland and heath on the coast and tablelands, and grows on soils derived from sandstone or granite, in south-eastern Queensland, eastern New South Wales and eastern Victoria.

Conservation
Patersonia sericea is not considered to be at risk in the wild.

Use in horticulture
It is a reliable species in cultivation, thriving in hot, dry situations and is also frost tolerant. It is useful grown en masse in a bed of perennial plants.

Ecology
Patersonia sericea is used as larval food by two species of butterfly, the eastern iris-skipper (Mesodina halyzia) and montane iris-skipper (Mesodina aeluropis).

References

sericea
Flora of New South Wales
Flora of Queensland
Flora of Victoria (Australia)
Asparagales of Australia
Plants described in 1807
Taxa named by Robert Brown (botanist, born 1773)